Anton Julius "A.J." Rockne (December 19, 1868 or 1869  – May 2, 1950) was a Minnesota Republican politician, and the longest-serving state senator in the history of Minnesota.

Background

Rockne was born in Harmony, Minnesota, to Norwegian immigrant parents. Rockne graduated from Decorah Institute, in Decorah, Iowa.  Rockne received a degree from the University of Minnesota Law School in 1894. He was admitted to the Bar on June 7, 1894, and practiced as an attorney.

He was married to Susie Albertson on December 10, 1899, and had three children. Anton J. Rockne was a director and charter member of the Norwegian fraternal organization, Vosselag, at its founding in 1909.

Career
He was elected to the Minnesota House of Representatives in 1902. In 1909 he was selected to serve as Speaker of the Minnesota House of Representatives, a position he held for two years.
In 1910, Rockne was elected to the Minnesota Senate. He would hold the seat for 36 years, longer than any senator in state history. Rockne served as chairman of the powerful finance committee for from 1915 to 1947. His 44 combined years of legislative service tie him with Carl M. Iverson for the greatest length of legislative service in state history until Lyndon Carlson passed it on January 3, 2017.

References

Other sources

Curtiss-Wedge, Franklyn History of Goodhue County, Minnesota (Chicago: H.C. Cooper, Jr. & Co. 1910)

External links 
 Anton Julius Rockne in MNopedia, the Minnesota Encyclopedia 

1868 births
1950 deaths
American people of Norwegian descent
Republican Party members of the Minnesota House of Representatives
Republican Party Minnesota state senators
People from Zumbrota, Minnesota
University of Minnesota Law School alumni
People from Harmony, Minnesota